Tacitus was a Roman historian and senator.

Tacitus may also refer to:

Tacitus (emperor), Roman emperor in 275–276
Tacitus (crater), a lunar impact crater, named after the Roman historian
Tacitus (horse) (foaled 2016), an American Thoroughbred racehorse
3097 Tacitus, an asteroid named after the Roman historian

See also 

Tacticus (disambiguation)
Tacitus bellus, or Graptopetalum bellum, a succulent plant